Herman Andrew Stevens (born June 10, 1955) is an American executive, film producer, director and actor.

Early life
Stevens was born in Memphis, Tennessee, the only child of actress Stella Stevens and her former husband Noble Herman Stephens.

Career
Prior to his producing career, Stevens was a writer, director, and actor. He had a bit role  in Shampoo (1975), and went on to appear in cult thrillers such as Massacre at Central High (1976), Vigilante Force (1976) and Day of the Animals (1977), as well as the cult horror film The Fury (1978) starring Kirk Douglas. He was nominated for a Golden Globe Award for his performance in The Boys in Company C (1978), and later starred with Charles Bronson in two films, Death Hunt (1981) and 10 to Midnight (1983).

In 1975 he auditioned for the role of Luke Skywalker in Star Wars which eventually went to Mark Hamill.

He appeared in the miniseries Once an Eagle (1976) and played 17-year-old Andrew Thorpe on the NBC Western series The Oregon Trail. The program filmed only thirteen episodes, seven of which never aired. Also the Canadian television series The New Liars Club.

Stevens starred in The Bastard (1978) and The Rebels (1979), based on the John Jakes novels. He appeared opposite Dennis Weaver and Susan Dey in the short-lived drama Emerald Point N.A.S., as a playboy/tennis bum in Columbo: Murder in Malibu, and as one of J.R. Ewing's stooges Casey Denault, on Dallas, for two seasons, beginning in 1987. He also played Ted Rorchek in the 1981-82 television series Code Red. He appeared in the miniseries Hollywood Wives (1985). During this time, he also starred in the erotic thriller Night Eyes (1990) and its sequels.

Producing

In early 1990, Stevens left the public eye to become an independent entrepreneur writing, producing, directing and financing films for his own companies. He was President/CEO of Franchise Pictures, which produced films for Warner Bros. from 1999 through 2005, including The Whole Nine Yards and its sequel, The Whole Ten Yards, as well as The In-Laws.

Franchise and its subsidiaries filed for Chapter 11 bankruptcy on August 19, 2004, after losing a multimillion-dollar fraud case in Los Angeles, and is now defunct.

Prior to Franchise, Stevens was an owner and president of Royal Oaks Entertainment, which produced and/or distributed seventy pictures over a three-year period including many HBO, Showtime and Sci-Fi Channel world premieres. Prior to Royal Oaks, Stevens' entrée into foreign sales and production company ownership was with Sunset Films International, which amassed a library of 19 titles (including seven in-house productions) during his first year as president of the company. He currently operates Andrew Stevens Entertainment and Stevens Entertainment Group.

In 2017, he published a screenwriting manual, Screenwriting for Profit: Writing for the Global Marketplace. The book discusses how writers can use better understanding of the domestic and international film markets to assist their screenplays.

Personal life
Prior to his marriages, he dated Pattie Sullivan from 1976 to 1978. Stevens was married to actress Kate Jackson from 1978 to 1982. He has three children by his second marriage to Robyn Suzanne Scott, which ended in divorce in 2010. Stevens married Diana Phillips Hoogland in 2016.

Acting, directing, and producing credits

References

External links
 
 
 

1955 births
Living people
Male actors from Memphis, Tennessee
American male film actors
Film producers from Tennessee
American male soap opera actors
American male television actors
American male voice actors
Screenwriting instructors
Film directors from Tennessee
American expatriate male actors in the United Kingdom